"I Love Music" is a song by American R&B group The O'Jays. It was written by production team Gamble and Huff. The song appeared on The O'Jays 1975 album, Family Reunion. The single reached number five on the US Billboard Hot 100 and number one on the soul singles chart. In the UK, the song peaked at number 13 in the Top 40 singles charts in March 1976. The single spent eight weeks at number one on the US Disco File Top 20 chart.

Because of the song's length of 6:51, only the first part of the song received the airplay of 3:37.  This song is noteworthy for the use of the Bongos, heard in the intro, as well as the electric guitar solo, heard in the instrumental second part of the song. Also, the saxophone solos are heard between the choruses and the verses and bridges. Strings, trumpets, bass, piano, vibes, and drums dominate the accompaniment of the song.

Charts

Weekly charts

Year-end charts

Other cover versions
In 1976, a live cover version appears on the album LIVE performed by 3M Productions, also known as Major Harris, Blue Magic and Margie Joseph, recorded at the Latin Casino.  In 1990, Chicago House music vocalist Darryl Pandy released a version of the song on Warner Bros. Records which remained faithful to the original version.  The track featured a prominent keyboard riff, brass, and a driving House beat.

Rozalla version

In 1993, the Zambian-born singer Rozalla covered "I Love Music" for her second album, Look No Further (1995). Her version of the song also appeared on the soundtrack to the film Carlito's Way, starring Al Pacino. The single was the first of a series of cover versions Rozalla was to record over the years. It was also her first "new" song to be released on Sony Records, as her earlier releases had all been first put out by British indie label Pulse 8. Rozalla's recording of "I Love Music" reached number-one on the Billboard Hot Dance Club Play chart in the US. It also dented the Billboard Hot 100, peaking at number 76. In Europe, the song got to number 18 on the UK Singles Chart in 1994, marking something of a comeback after various earlier singles had failed to crack the top 40 (this was still 5 places lower than the original version by The O'Jays had reached however). The song also peaked at number five in Iceland, number six in Finland and number nine in Zimbabwe.

Critical reception
The song received favorable reviews from music critics. Barry Walters from The Advocate deemed it a "respectful rendering". Larry Flick from Billboard described it as a "spirited reading of the O'Jays classic". He noted that Rozalla "has developed a smoother, more soulful vocal quality". Gil L. Robertson IV from Cash Box picked it as a "standout track" of the Look No Further album. Dave Sholin from the Gavin Report wrote, "International sensation Rozalla and producer Jellybean extract every ounce of excitement out of this 1976 O'Jays hit." Alan Jones from Music Week said, "Though she acquits herself well, not one of the mixes approaches the classy exaltation of the original. For all that, this is sure to give Rozalla yet another hit." In 1994, another editor, Andy Beevers rated it four out of five, noting it as a "rather routine Jellybean-produced cover". Wendi Cermak from The Network Forty declared it as "a fabulous remake".

Charts

Weekly charts

Year-end charts

Usage in film
The song appears in the 1993 film Carlito's Way and in the 2007 film Pride.

References

 Billboard, Guinness Book of British Hit Singles & artist website

External links
[ Song review] on Allmusic
 

1975 singles
1993 singles
The O'Jays songs
Songs written by Leon Huff
Disco songs
Rozalla songs
Songs about music
Philadelphia International Records singles
Sony Music singles
1975 songs
Songs written by Kenny Gamble